The High and the Mighty may refer to:

 The High and the Mighty (novel), a novel by Ernest K. Gann
 The High and the Mighty (film), a film based on the novel
 "The High and the Mighty" (1954 song), a song from the film
 The High and the Mighty (album), an album by Donnie Iris
 "The High and the Mighty" (Donnie Iris song), a song from the album
 The High & Mighty, a Philadelphia hip-hop group
 The High and the Mighty (1958 album), an album by Lionel Hampton

See also
 High and Mighty (disambiguation)